Susannah Lazar is an American medical physicist, amateur astronomer and a discoverer of minor planets.

She is affiliated with the Highland Road Park Observatory, where she co-discovered asteroid 20430 Stout with Walter R. Cooney, Jr. at age 16, and named it after her late great-grandfather Earl Douglas Stout (c. 1895–1985).

At the time she was a home school senior in Baton Rouge, Louisiana.

See also 
 List of minor planet discoverers

References

External links 
National Young Astronomer Award, The Astronomical League

21st-century American physicists
American women astronomers
Discoverers of minor planets
Medical physicists
People from Baton Rouge, Louisiana
Living people
Year of birth missing (living people)